Alfred Obeng-Boateng (born 23 November 1973) is a Ghanaian politician who is a member of the New Patriotic Party. He is the member of parliament for the Bibiani-Anhwiaso-Bekwai constituency in the Western North Region of Ghana.

Early life and education 
Obeng-Boateng hails from Subiri Nkwanta. A graduate of Kwame Nkrumah University of Science and Technology, he holds masters of law (Oil and Gas).

References 

Living people
New Patriotic Party politicians
Ghanaian MPs 2021–2025
1973 births
Kwame Nkrumah University of Science and Technology alumni